Leslie Pye (6 July 1871 – 9 March 1949) was an Australian cricketer. He played 29 first-class matches for New South Wales between 1896/97 and 1905/06.

See also
 List of New South Wales representative cricketers

References

External links
 

1871 births
1949 deaths
Australian cricketers
New South Wales cricketers
Cricketers from Sydney